The Aethra Chronicles - Volume One: Celystra's Bane or The Aethra Chronicles (also known as Aethra for short) is an MS-DOS role-playing video game released as shareware in 1994. The game is based on the Rolemaster game system, a Pencil & Paper role playing game. It was written - mostly as a one-man project - by Michael Lawrence with some help from others for the graphics and sound/music.

The first volume of the game is split into three chapters: The Book of Prophecy, Gems of Power, and Demons Might. The Book of Prophecy was freely distributed. The other two chapters could be purchased through information in the first chapter. Two additional volumes were planned, but not created.

Plot 
The small kingdom of Celystra was prosperous under its old king, "Korros the Wise". The prince, Lythare, has ascended to the throne and his wife has given birth to a child on his coronation day. However, two days later this newborn infant disappears, presumed kidnapped. Lythare blames the kingdom's Champion Knight-Paladin, as well as several members of the court for failing to protect the child, and imprisons them in the dungeon. The Champion's son, knowing that his father must not have deserved imprisonment, sets out on a quest to find the baby with his two companions.

Gameplay 
The game is mostly played through a bird's eye view perspective where the camera is either showing the country scape, a town or a dungeon. Each version 'zooms in' closer to the ground and the resulting view shows more detail. For combat, the game uses a side view, that is dynamically constructed from the location the player's party was just before combat commenced.

The player is in control of the protagonist and two other characters and sets out to investigate the imprisonment of his or her father by the new King. Additional henchmen can be hired for a total of 6 controllable characters at the time.

Confusion about the sequels 
The first volume 'Celystra's Bane' was made and released; it contained three chapters: 'The Book of Prophecy', 'Gems of Power' and 'Demons Might'. As was typical with shareware games, the first chapter could be freely distributed, with the other two available only to registered users. The second and third volumes were never made. Because the shareware version only contained a single chapter, some people assumed that the second and third 'chapters' (instead of Volumes) where never made and the game was left incomplete. This confusion sometimes still survives some 20 years after the game's release.

External links
 The Unofficial Aethra Pages
 The Aethra Chronicles - An unofficial homepage

1994 video games
DOS games
DOS-only games
Role-playing video games
Video games developed in the United States